"Street of Dreams" is a song by the American rock band Guns N' Roses, featured on their 2008 album Chinese Democracy. The song is the third promotional song sent to radio stations, but was not released as a commercial single eligible for international Singles charts. From 2001 to 2008, the song was called "The Blues", but was changed to "Street of Dreams" for the album's release.

The song was originally written in 1999 by the band's leader and lead vocalist Axl Rose, but bassist Tommy Stinson and keyboardist Dizzy Reed contributed some of the guitar, bass and piano melodies.

"Street of Dreams" was a staple at Guns N' Roses concerts since 2001, being played at almost every show on the various Chinese Democracy Tours and on the Up Close and Personal Tour in 2012. Although it was part of the initial concerts for the Appetite for Democracy tour, featuring on the Appetite for Democracy 3D live album, the song left the set list and was not played during the Not In This Lifetime... Tour. After being missing from the setlist for 10 years, it was performed for the very first time with the reunited lineup in June 18, 2022 in Prague.

Personnel
Credits are adapted from the album's liner notes.
Guns N' Roses
 Axl Rose – lead vocals
 Paul Tobias, Richard Fortus and Ron "Bumblefoot" Thal – rhythm guitar
 Robin Finck and Buckethead – lead guitar
 Tommy Stinson – bass, backing vocals
 Brain – drums
 Dizzy Reed – piano, keyboards, backing vocals, Synth orchestra 
 Chris Pitman – synthesizer, sub bass, programming, keyboards, Synth orchestra

Additional credits
 Orchestra – Paul Buckmaster, Marco Beltrami
 Orchestral arrangement – Dizzy Reed, Paul Buckmaster, Marco Beltrami
 Guitar solos – Robin Finck, Buckethead
 Arrangement – Axl Rose, Sean Beavan
 Drum arrangement – Josh Freese, Brain
 Digital editing – Eric Caudieux, Caram Costanzo, Axl Rose, Sean Beavan

Chart positions

References

Guns N' Roses songs
2009 singles
2008 songs
Songs written by Axl Rose
Songs written by Dizzy Reed
Songs written by Paul Tobias
Songs written by Tommy Stinson
Geffen Records singles